Mühlenbeck-Mönchmühle is a railway station in the Oberhavel district of Brandenburg. It is served by the S-Bahn line . The station was opened on 2 September 1984. The station is one of the few, which is just single-track. It does not cause problems, because only every 10 minutes a train stops (from each side every 20 minutes).

References

Berlin S-Bahn stations
Railway stations in Brandenburg
Buildings and structures in Oberhavel
Railway stations in Germany opened in 1984